Enteromius brevilateralis is a species of ray-finned fish in the genus Enteromius from the upper Kwanza in Angola..

References

 

Endemic fauna of Angola
Enteromius
Taxa named by Max Poll
Fish described in 1967